Juan Guillermo Córdova Torres (born 25 June 1995) is a professional footballer who plays for Chilean Primera División club Ñublense. Born in Chile, he has represented the Canada national team.

Career

Club
Córdova joined Unión San Felipe at the age of 16. He scored his first league goal for the club against Rangers on 21 January 2017.

In May 2017, Córdova joined Huachipato of the Chilean Primera División.

In December 2022, Córdova departed Huachipato and joined fellow Chilean side Ñublense.

International
Born in Chile, Córdova holds a Canadian passport through his father, who was also born in Chile, but is a Canadian citizen. He represented Chile at the U-20 level, making 5 appearances in 2014. Córdova was called up to the Canadian U-23 side for the 2017 Aspire tournament held in Qatar on 19 March 2017. He made his debut against Uzbekistan on March 25 in a 1–0 win.

In May 2017 Córdova was called up to the senior team for a friendly against Curaçao.

In May 2019, Córdova was called up to the 40-man provisional squad for the 2019 CONCACAF Gold Cup.

Career statistics

Personal life
Córdova was born in Chile and lived with his father's family in Canada. Eventually, he returned to Chile along with his mother. Since the age of five, he has held dual Chilean-Canadian citizenship.

References

External links
 
 

1995 births
Living people
People from Los Andes Province, Chile
Canadian soccer players
Canada men's under-23 international soccer players
Canada men's international soccer players
Canadian people of Chilean descent
Naturalized citizens of Canada
Chilean footballers
Chile under-20 international footballers
Association football fullbacks
Unión San Felipe footballers
C.D. Huachipato footballers
Ñublense footballers
Primera B de Chile players
Chilean Primera División players